Lavells Lake is a   Local Nature Reserve on the outskirts of Woodley, a suburb of Reading in Berkshire. It is owned by Wokingham District Council and managed by the council and The Friends of Lavell's Lake. The nature reserve is part of Dinton Pastures Country Park.

Geography and site
The nature reserve is a lake made from an old gravel pit and it has several bird hides.

History

The lake was opened to the public in 1979 as part of the country park after the area was used for extracting gravel for 14 years.

In 1992 the site was declared as a local nature reserve by Wokingham Borough Council.

Fauna
The site has the following fauna:

Mammals
Soprano pipistrelle
Common pipistrelle
Daubenton's bat
Brown long-eared bat
European rabbit
Red fox
Roe deer
Muntjac deer
Stoat
Weasel
Wood mouse
Eastern gray squirrel
Field vole

Invertebrates

Birds

Amphibians and reptiles
Common frog
Grass snake
Common toad
Smooth newt
Great crested newt
Red-eared slider

Flora
The site has the following flora:

Trees
Betula pendula
Prunus spinosa

Plants

Impatiens glandulifera
Leucojum aestivum
Ulex europaeus
Anthriscus sylvestris
Dipsacus
Primula veris
Phragmites communis
Inula helenium

References

Parks and open spaces in Berkshire
Nature reserves in Berkshire
Local Nature Reserves in Berkshire